Filip Mladenović (born 15 August 1991) is a Serbian professional footballer who plays as a left-back for Ekstraklasa side Legia Warsaw. Mladenović made his debut for the Serbia national team in 2012.

Club career

Borac Čačak
He became a member of the Borac senior team in the 2010–11 season, making 18 league appearances that season. He played as left-back.

Red Star Belgrade
Mladenović signed a four-year contract for Red Star Belgrade on 17 December 2011. During the summer of 2013, Red Star participated in the Uhrencup in Switzerland, where they lost the final against FC Basel with a score of 2–1. Mladenović scored for Red Star and was voted best player of the game, for which he was supposed to get a watch as a prize, but he rejected it out of disappointment with the loss. By the end of 2013, Red Star's financial situation became very unstable as players and staff were not getting paid after several months of waiting. In spite of his frequent scoring and lanky frame, Mladenović was played mostly as a left back under coach Ricardo Sá Pinto, who said that Mladenović's playing style reminded him of Fábio Coentrão. An exodus began when Sá Pinto announced in an emotional press conference when he said that he could no longer work at Red Star due to instabilities in the team's administration. On 5 October 2013, Mladenović filed a request to have his contract terminated with Red Star. The Arbitration Committee in the FSS ruled in Mladenović's favor on 23 November, giving him the status of a free agent. After the ruling on Mladenović and Marko Vešović, coach Slaviša Stojanovič took both players off of the first team, but legally were still members of Red Star until the winter 2013–14 transfer window.

BATE Borisov
On 23 February 2014, Serbian news portal B92 reported that Mladenović signed for Belarusian team BATE Borisov with a three-year contract. He made his debut for BATE in the 2014 Belarusian Super Cup final against FC Minsk, and went on to score a goal 20 minutes into the game. On 29 September 2015, Mladenović scored two goals for BATE in the 2015–16 UEFA Champions League Group E against Roma. Thanks to his breakthrough game, Mladenović was listed on UEFA.com's Champions League "Team of the Week" on 1 October 2015. Later that month, AC Milan was reported to show interest with their coach Siniša Mihajlović having known Mladenović from coaching the Serbian national team.

1. FC Köln
On 5 January 2016, Mladenović signed a three and a half-year contract with 1. FC Köln.

International career
Mladenović made his debut for the Serbia national football team under coach Siniša Mihajlović on 31 May 2012, in a 2–0 loss against France.

In November 2022, he was selected in Serbia's squad for the 2022 FIFA World Cup in Qatar. He played in a group stage match against Brazil.

Career statistics

Club

International

International goals
Scores and results list Serbia's goal tally first.

Honours

Club
Red Star
 Serbian Cup: 2011–12

FC BATE Borisov
 Belarusian Premier League (2): 2014, 2015
 Belarusian Cup: 2014–15
 Belarusian Super Cup (2): 2014, 2015

Lechia Gdańsk
 Polish Cup: 2019
 Polish Super Cup: 2019

Legia Warsaw
 Ekstraklasa: 2020–21

Individual
 Serbian SuperLiga Team of the Season: 2011–12
 Ekstraklasa Player of the Season: 2020–21
 Ekstraklasa Defender of the Season: 2020–21

References

External links
 Filip Mladenović at Utakmica.rs

1991 births
Living people
Sportspeople from Čačak
Serbian footballers
Association football defenders
Serbia under-21 international footballers
Serbia international footballers
Serbian expatriate footballers
Expatriate footballers in Belarus
Expatriate footballers in Germany
Expatriate footballers in Belgium
Expatriate footballers in Poland
Serbian SuperLiga players
Belarusian Premier League players
Bundesliga players
Belgian Pro League players
Ekstraklasa players
III liga players
FK Borac Čačak players
Red Star Belgrade footballers
FC BATE Borisov players
1. FC Köln players
Standard Liège players
Lechia Gdańsk players
Legia Warsaw players
Legia Warsaw II players
2022 FIFA World Cup players